Edith Marold (born 2 July 1942) is an Austrian philologist who specializes in Germanic studies.

Biography
Edith Marold was born in Salzburg, Austria on 2 July 1942. He received her Ph.D. in Germanic studies at the University of Vienna in 1967 with a thesis on blacksmiths in Germanic Antiquity. Marold subsequently worked at the Saarland University, where she habilitated in Germanic and Nordic philology in 1977. She subsequently served as Head of the Old Germanic Department of the Institute for Germanic Studies of the Saarland University. Since 1989, Marold was Professor of Old Germanic and Nordic Philology at the University of Kiel. She retired from Kiel in 2007, but has continued to teach and research.

See also
 Rudolf Simek
 Klaus Düwel

Sources
 Kürschners Deutscher Gelehrten-Kalender, 4 Teilbände. De Gruyter: Berlin (23. Ausgabe) 2011. 

1942 births
Austrian non-fiction writers
Austrian philologists
Germanic studies scholars
Living people
Old Norse studies scholars
People from Salzburg
University of Vienna alumni
Academic staff of the University of Kiel
Academic staff of Saarland University
Writers on Germanic paganism